Protein BANP is a protein that can be found in humans, it is encoded by the BANP gene. It is a member of the human gene family, "BEN-domain containing", which includes eight other genes: BEND2, BEND3, BEND4, BEND5, BEND6, BEND7, NACC1 (BEND8), and NACC2 (BEND9). BANP is a protein coding gene that is located in the Nucleoplasm. Its official name is BTG3 associated with nuclear protein. It plays a role in DNA binding, chromatin regulation, repressor, transcription regulation and the cell cycle process. In recombination BANP protein represses T-cell receptors to control recombination during transcription. As a tumor suppressor BANP negatively regulates p53 transcription in recombination. It can be expressed in various tissues in the body including the testis, spleen, and the placenta.

Function 

This gene encodes a protein that binds to matrix attachment regions. The protein functions as a tumor suppressor and cell cycle regulator. Alternate transcriptional splice variants, encoding different isoforms, have been characterized.

References

External links

Further reading